Parker Thompson "Pete" Hart (September 28, 1910 – October 15, 1997) was a United States diplomat.

Biography

Parker T. Hart was born in Medford, Massachusetts on September 28, 1910.  He received a BA from Dartmouth College in 1933, an MA from Harvard University in 1935, and a diploma from the Graduate Institute of International Studies in Geneva in 1936.  He attended the Edmund A. Walsh School of Foreign Service in 1936.

After completing his studies, Hart joined the United States Foreign Service.  His first posting was in Vienna in 1938, the year of the Anschluss.  He was posted to Brazil from 1942 to 1949.  In 1949, Hart opened the U.S. consulate in Dhahran, the site of Saudi Arabia's newly discovered oilfields.  Hart was posted to Washington, D.C. in 1952, as Director of the Office of Near East Affairs.  He returned to the field in 1955 as Deputy Chief of Mission in Cairo.  He was briefly consul general in Damascus in 1958.  Later in 1958, he returned to the U.S. to serve as Deputy Assistant Secretary of State for Near East and South Asian Affairs.

In 1961, President of the United States John F. Kennedy named Hart United States Ambassador to Saudi Arabia; Ambassador Hart presented his credentials on July 22, 1961, and served there until his credentials were terminated on May 29, 1965.  He was concurrently United States Ambassador to North Yemen from October 1, 1961, to September 27, 1962, and the first United States Ambassador to Kuwait from 1962 to 1963.  From 1965 to 1968, Ambassador Hart was United States Ambassador to Turkey; in this capacity he negotiated a settlement that prevented war between two NATO allies, Greece and Turkey, over Cyprus.

President Lyndon B. Johnson nominated Hart as Assistant Secretary of State for Near Eastern and South Asian Affairs in 1965 and Hart held this office from October 14, 1968, until February 4, 1969.  He was the first assistant secretary capable of speaking the Arabic language.  He was replaced when Richard Nixon took power and National Security Advisor Henry Kissinger moved U.S. foreign policy in the region in a more pro-Israel direction.  Hart then spent several months as Director of the Foreign Service Institute, before resigning from the United States Department of State later in 1969.

Hart served as President of the Middle East Institute from 1969 to 1973.  He then worked as a special representative and consultant for Bechtel from 1973 to 1990.  He retired in 1990 and would go on to publish two books of memoirs

In retirement, Hart lived in Washington, D.C., where he died on October 15, 1997.  He was 87 years old

Selected publications

Papers 
Additional material about Parker T. Hart can be found in the University of Wyoming American Heritage Center's archives. The archives include correspondences, reports, speeches, and subject files about development of business possibilities in, and the political climate of, the Middle East for his consulting work with the Bechtel Corporation, as well as RCA, U.S. Steel, and IBM. There is a small amount of correspondence related to the Arab boycott of Egypt. Hart's consultation services concerning General Motors’ Saudi Arabian petition to the Saudi government for reimbursement of expenses incurred in connection with its vehicle assembly program are documented, and there is background information on Prince Talal, son of the founding King of Saudi Arabia, which Hart provided to the Santa Fe International Corporation.

References

External links
In Memoriam in the Washington Report on Middle East Affairs

 The Papers of Parker T. Hart at Dartmouth College Library
Parker T. Hart Papers at University of Wyoming - American Heritage Center

1910 births
1997 deaths
United States Assistant Secretaries of State
People from Medford, Massachusetts
Dartmouth College alumni
Harvard University alumni
Graduate Institute of International and Development Studies alumni
Ambassadors of the United States to Saudi Arabia
Ambassadors of the United States to Kuwait
Ambassadors of the United States to Turkey
Ambassadors of the United States to North Yemen
Walsh School of Foreign Service alumni
United States Foreign Service personnel
20th-century American diplomats